Sutton High School for Boys was a grammar school in Sutton, Plymouth, Devon, England, from 1926 to 1986. It was evacuated to St Austell, Cornwall, during World War II.

The school's building in Regent Street has been converted into flats.  The school's war memorial plaques were moved to St John's Church, Plymouth.

History 
The school, built of Plymouth limestone, first opened in 1897 as the Regent Street Higher Grade School when pupils from Mount Street Higher Grade Board School moved into the building.  The School motto was "shine to serve" and it continued until a reorganisation in 1926 when boys from Keppel Place Central School exchanged Places with the Girls in Regent Street Higher Grade School.  The boys' school in Regent Street became known as Sutton Secondary School for Boys and the girls' school Stoke Damerel High School for Girls.  Eventually despite the actions of the LEA the name was changed to Sutton High School for Boys.

Perhaps because of their shared history a close relationship was maintained between Sutton High and Stoke Damerel until they were both closed in 1986.

Notable alumni 
 Admiral Sir Nigel Stuart Henderson
 Peter Knight, arranger and musical director
 Sir Alfred John Sims (1907–77), naval architect

Headmasters 
 1926-35  Mr A L Strachan
 1935-58 Dr C F Jones
 1958-71 Mr H J Bristow
 1971-84 Dr J S Rowe
 1984-86 Dr D McCallan

References

Further reading

Educational institutions established in 1926
Educational institutions disestablished in 1986
Defunct grammar schools in England
Defunct schools in Plymouth, Devon
Boys' schools in Devon
1926 establishments in England